In Search of Sunrise 10: Australia is a compilation album by Dutch trance producer Richard Durand. It was released on 18 June 2012 by SongBird. It is the tenth installment in the In Search of Sunrise compilation series. To celebrate the tenth release in the series, a contest was launched. The goal was to mix the best compilation of tracks from the older In Search Of Sunrise mixes. The winner, Thomas Mengel, got his mix released as the third CD.

Track listing

References

External links 
 In Search of Sunrise 10: Australia at Black Hole Official Online Store
 

Electronic compilation albums
2011 compilation albums